The Peru International Series is an international open badminton tournament in Peru, established since 2015, organized by the Federación Deportiva Peruana de Bádminton, sanctioned by the Badminton World Federation and Badminton Pan Am. This tournament was held for the first time from 19 to 22 February 2015 at the Polideportivo 2, Centro de Alto Rendimiento, Villa Deportiva Nacional, in Lima. The tournament is the second grade of the international tournament in Peru after the Peru International, and in 2018 the tournament downgraded to BWF Future Series event.

Previous winners

Performances by nation

References 

Badminton tournaments in Peru
Sports competitions in Peru
Recurring sporting events established in 2015
2015 establishments in Peru